Star City is an unincorporated community in Calhoun County, Illinois.

References

Unincorporated communities in Calhoun County, Illinois
Unincorporated communities in Illinois